The 1913 Arkansas Razorbacks football team represented the University of Arkansas during the 1913 college football season. In their first year under head coach Earle T. Pickering, the Razorbacks compiled a 7–2 record, shut out five of their nine opponents, and outscored all opponents by a combined total of 137 to 43.

Schedule

References

Arkansas
Arkansas Razorbacks football seasons
Arkansas Razorbacks football